Aibota Yertaikyzy (born 28 March 2004) is a Kazakh rhythmic gymnast. She represent her country in international competitions.

Career 
Aibota debuted into the senior category at the 2021 World Cup in Minsk, ending 15th in the All-Around, 12th with hoop, 11th with ball, 12th with clubs and 20th with ribbon. 

In 2022 she competed at the World Cup in Athens, taking 14th in the All-Around, 17th with hoop, 9th with ball, 11th with clubs and 11th with ribbon. A week later she was in Sofia, being 15th n the All-Around, 16th with hoop, 17th with ball, 12th with clubs and 13th with ribbon. From June 23 to 26 she participated at the 2022 Asian Rhythmic Gymnastics Championships in Pattaya, winning silver in the team category. In August  Yertaikyzy competed at the 2021 Islamic Solidarity Games in Konya where she won bronze in teams. In September Aibota took part in the World Championships in Sofia along Elzhana Taniyeva and the senior group, taking 24th place in the All-Around, 18th with hoop, 29th with ball, 24th with clubs and 17th with ribbon.

References 

Living people
2004 births
Kazakhstani rhythmic gymnasts